Robert Thompson was in 2007 the youngest British chef to be awarded a Michelin star in his own right. He achieved this at Winteringham Fields, Lincolnshire before again earning a star at The Hambrough restaurant in Ventnor, on the Isle of Wight. Thompson left the Hambrough in 2013  and in 2014 began working at the George Hotel in nearby Yarmouth. In 2015 Robert Thompson opened his first solo concept restaurant called Thompson's on the Isle of Wight in the town Newport.

Career
Born in Bedfordshire England, Robert Thompson was inspired to cook by brother Patrick and acquired a love of cooking at just 10 years old. After attending Thames Valley Community College, Robert started his cooking career with an apprenticeship at L'Ortolan in Reading then Sojourns at The Falcon and Chimney's Restaurant. Robert settled as a commis chef in 2001 at Winteringham Fields under Michelin chef Germain Schwabb winning the 2006 Acorn Award. Robert was named head chef two years later at the age of 23 after Germain retired. Here Robert was awarded his first Michelin star and listed as chef to watch for the future by journalist Jay Rayner.

After maintaining two Michelin stars and winning one of his own, Robert departed for Waldo's at the Cliveden for one year  but was recruited to be the face of a hotel business on the Isle of Wight at The Hambrough in Ventnor. Four months after taking on head chef duties in 2008, Thompson won the Isle of Wight its only Michelin star  and listed 20th best restaurant in the UK by the Good Food Guide as well as 18th in the Sunday Times Hardens Top 100.

Robert has now opened his first solo restaurant on the Isle of Wight in the town of Newport named Thompson's Restaurant

References

Living people
People from Bedfordshire
English chefs
Head chefs of Michelin starred restaurants
1981 births
People from Ventnor